Hollace Shaw (July 24, 1913 – March 2, 1976) was a coloratura soprano who performed on old-time radio and on the stage.

Early years
Shaw was born in Fresno, California. Her father, Rev. Shirley R. Shaw, was a minister, and her mother was a concert singer. She was the oldest of five children, one of whom was Robert Shaw, who founded the Robert Shaw Chorale and directed symphony orchestras in Atlanta, Georgia, and Cleveland, Ohio.

Radio
Shaw was a featured soloist on Blue Velvet Music, Saturday Night Serenade and the featured female soloist on Song Time and was a member of the cast of The Hour of Charm, on which she was known as "Vivian." She also had her own weekly program on CBS.

Stage
Shaw's Broadway credits include Higher and Higher (1939) and Very Warm for May (1939). The latter production included her introduction of the song All the Things You Are.

Personal appearances
Shaw sang frequently with symphony orchestras around the United States and at Radio City Music Hall, in New York City. She also performed in night clubs. Eugene Burr wrote about Shaw in a review in Billboard's October 12, 1940, issue: "She has an outstanding voice, one of the few real voices that have been developed in recent years..."

Personal life
On April 12, 1944, Shaw married Clarence Turner Foster, a major in the Air Transport Command, in New York, New York. She later married Dr. Frederick C. Schlumberger, a surgeon.

Death
Shaw died March 2, 1976, in Los Angeles, California, at age 62. She was survived by her husband, two stepchildren, a sister and two brothers.

References

1913 births
1976 deaths
20th-century American singers
20th-century American women singers
Musicians from Fresno, California
Singers from California
Pomona College alumni